"Feels Like We Only Go Backwards" is a song by Australian psychedelic rock band Tame Impala. It is the seventh track on their 2012 album Lonerism, and was released as its second single on 1 October 2012. The single features artwork from Australian artist Leif Podhajsky, who also created the artwork for their first album, Innerspeaker. In an interview with Rick Rubin on the podcast Broken Record, Kevin Parker said he wrote "Feels Like We Only Go Backwards" after being inspired by "Walk in the Park" by Beach House.

At the 2013 West Australian Music Industry Awards, the song won Single of the Year.

Music video
The music video was directed by Joseph Pelling and Becky Sloan, best known as creators of Don't Hug Me I'm Scared web series. The music video consists of psychedelic clay animation.

Critical reception
The song was voted on many year end best of lists in 2012. Pitchfork named it the 7th best song of 2012, and said of the track; "it will blow your brain back to its most purely joyous and least cynical recesses." The same website also ranked it #192 on their list of the 200 best songs of the 2010s. It placed ninth on the Triple J Hottest 100 of 2012.

Usage in media
"Feels Like We Only Go Backwards" was used in the promotion of Via X's Chilean TV program Moov.

The Irish sports podcast Second Captains used the song as the theme music for its 2014 FIFA World Cup coverage.

The collaboration version of the song (with Kendrick Lamar) was featured in the movie Divergent.

The song was used in the Netflix show The Imperfects.

Charts

Certifications

References

2012 songs
2012 singles
APRA Award winners
Song recordings produced by Kevin Parker
Songs written by Kevin Parker (musician)
Tame Impala songs
Animated music videos